Henry Jones may refer to:

Arts
Henry Jones (poet) (1721–1770), poet and dramatist, born Drogheda, Louth
Henry Jones (photographer) (1826–1911), commercial photographer in Victoria and South Australia
Henry Arthur Jones (1851–1929), English playwright
Henry Festing Jones (1851–1928), author
Henry Jones Thaddeus (1859–1929), Irish painter
Henry Stuart Jones (1867–1939), British academic, professor ancient history
Henry Jones (actor) (1912–1999), American stage, film and television actor
Henry Z Jones, Jr. (born 1940), genealogist and actor

Business and charity
Henry Jones (B'nai Brith), founder of B'nai Brith in 1843
Henry Jones (baker) (1812–1891), creator of self-raising flour
Henry Jones (entrepreneur) (1862–1926), Australian entrepreneur
Henry Uliomereyon Jones, better known as Dr. Henry Jones, convicted of a fraudulent Ponzi scheme through Tri Energy

Military
Sir Henry Jones of Oxfordshire (died 1673), English army officer
Henry Mitchell Jones (1831–1916), Irish soldier

Politics and law
Henry Jones (lawyer) (died 1592), Welsh lawyer and clergyman
Henry Jones (Upper Canada politician) (1790–1860), politician in Upper Canada
Henry Frank Jones (1920–1964), Canadian politician
Sir Henry Haydn Jones (1863–1950), Welsh Liberal Party politician, MP 1910–1945
Henry Jones (MP) (died 1792), British Member of Parliament for Devizes, 1780–1784
Henry Cox Jones (1821–1913), prominent Alabama politician
Sir Henry Jones (MP for Carmarthenshire) (?1532–1586), Welsh MP for Carmarthenshire, Cardiganshire and Old Sarum

Science and social science
Henry Bence Jones (1813–1873), English physician and chemist
Sir Henry Jones (philosopher) (1852–1922), Welsh philosopher and academic

Sports and games
Henry Jones (second baseman) (1857–1955), 19th-century baseball second baseman
Henry Jones (pitcher), 19th-century baseball pitcher
Henry Jones (cricketer) (born 1989), English cricketer
Henry Jones (writer) (1831–1899), authority on card games and tennis; wrote under the pseudonym Cavendish 
Henry Jones (American football) (born 1967), American National Football League (NFL) defensive back

Others
Henry Jones (bishop) (c. 1605–1681), Church of Ireland bishop of Clogher and then of Meath
Henry Cadman Jones (1818–1902), English law reporter
Henry Church Jones (1870–1941), Church in Wales priest

Characters
Henry Jones, Jr., better known as Indiana Jones
Henry Jones, Sr., the father of Indiana Jones
Henry Jones, III, better known as Mutt Williams, Indiana Jones' son

Companies
Henry Jones IXL, a manufacturer of jams, conserves and sauces in Australia

See also
Harry Jones (disambiguation)

Jones, Henry